Jack Lynch (1910–1966) was an Australian rugby league footballer who played in the 1930s in the New South Wales Rugby Football League competition. His club career was with Eastern Suburbs and St. George.

Lynch attended Sydney's Waverley College, before being graded by the Eastern Suburbs club. He made his First Grade debut for Eastern Suburbs in 1930, the same year as 1930s league star Dave Brown, who had also attended Waverley College.

Club career
In his debut match, the young winger, scored a hat trick of tries against Balmain. He was a member of the Eastern Suburbs side that was defeated by South Sydney in the 1931 premiership decider.

In 1931, Lynch managed to top the competition in terms of both points and tries scored.

Lynch joined the St. George club in 1933 where he played three seasons before returning to Eastern Suburbs in 1936. The Tricolours side that season was one of rugby league's greatest ever club sides, managing to finish the season undefeated. Lynch, playing in the centres to replace the injured Jack Beaton, was one of Eastern Suburbs' try scorers in the premiership-deciding match against Balmain. In 1937, Lynch returned to St. George Dragons where he played his final season.

During his career, Lynch played 88 first grade matches scoring a total of 416 points (40 tries and 148 goals). 59 of those matches were for Eastern Suburbs where he scored 28 tries and 142 goals, whilst during his time at St. George he scored 48 points (12 tries and 6 goals).

Administrative career
Following his retirement from the game as a player he became a graded referee, was a lower grade coach at the Eastern Suburbs club and served Club Secretary during the 1950s.

In 1963 he was a manager for that year's Kangaroo tour and a deputy vice-president of the New South Wales Rugby Football League.

Jack Lynch died after a suffering a heart attack in 1966.

References

* 

Australian rugby league players
Sydney Roosters players
St. George Dragons players
1966 deaths
1910 births
Australian rugby league administrators
Rugby league players from Sydney
Rugby league centres